The fat Guam partula, scientific name Partula gibba, is a species of air-breathing land snail, a terrestrial gastropod mollusk in the family Partulidae.

Distribution
This species occurs throughout the Mariana Archipelago, and has been reported in the greatest densities and population sizes on the isle of Sarigan.

Ecology 
On Sarigan, the species has been recorded most frequently in high-elevation native forests on the trunks of large Erythrina variegata specimens, often resting at the base of branches. On 19 May 2015 specimens were found consuming the Pandanus-fruit ejecta of the Mariana Fruit Bat on the leaves of a Pandanus tectorius tree. Mariana partulids have been noted to consume plant material, both living and decaying.

References

 Férussac A. E. J. (1821-1822). Tableaux systématiques des animaux mollusques suivis d'un Prodrome général pour tous les mollusques terrestres ou fluviatiles vivants ou fossilesPremière partie, Tableaux systématiques généraux, pp. i-xlvii. Deuxième partie, Tableaux particuliers des mollusques terrestres et fluviatiles, Classe des Gastéropodes. 1, Tableau de la famille des limaces, pp. 1–28. 2, Tableau de la famille des limaçons, pp. 1–92. 3, Tableau de la famille des auricules, pp. 93–114. [for details of dates of publication see Kennard A.S., 1942, Proceedings of the Malacological Society of London 25(3): 105-110]. Paris: Arthus-Bertrand. page(s): 66

External links

Partula (gastropod)
Taxonomy articles created by Polbot
ESA endangered species
Gastropods described in 1821
Taxa named by André Étienne d'Audebert de Férussac
Critically endangered fauna of the United States